Khayo (Xaayo) is a Bantu language spoken by the Luhya people of Kenya.

References

Languages of Kenya
Languages of Uganda
Luhya language